Enrico da Fucecchio (died c. 1297) was an Italian Roman Catholic bishop.

He was appointed on April 25, 1273 as Bishop of Diocese of Luni by Pope Gregory X. He insisted on performing his first mass at the Luni Cathedral, a ruined cathedral that had declined since the Roman period.

References
This article was initially translated from the Italian Wikipedia.

Bishops of Luni
1297 deaths
Year of birth unknown